The Bert Diaries are a series of novels written in the form of a diary, by Swedish writers Anders Jacobsson and Sören Olsson. The main character is a Swedish teenager called Bert Ljung, living in Öreskoga, a fictional town in Sweden, in the late 1980s and early 1990s. The first book came out in 1987. Bert and his friends also have a pop/rock band, the Heman Hunters.

A TV series was made in 1994, directed by Tomas Alfredson and Svante Kettner. It was followed by a feature film in 1995, also directed by Alfredson. In late-July 2016 the recording of a new Bert film was announced.

Between 1993 and 2002, a comic book, FF med Bert, was published and between 1992 and 1999, comic albums were published.

Main characters

Bert Ljung
Bert Ljung is the main character, the only son of optician Fredrik Ljung and bus driver Madelene (née Olsson). Bert starts as a 12-year-old child in the spring term of the 5th grade but later becomes a mischievous teenager discovering his own sexuality. From the book Berts första betraktelser, the readers can learn that Bert Ljung was born on February 21, 1976, but there are a lot of anachronisms, with the later books largely following a floating timeline. His family is also depicted in the books. In Berts bryderier, Bert tells the tale of his paternal great-grandfather Vladimir Livanov, who hailed from Saint Petersburg and made glasses, before building a raft and paddling with his hands and ending up in Gotland, where he married Beda (who dies on October 14 in Berts bravader). They had a son - Bert's paternal grandfather Stanislav Livanov, who after being teased for his name, changed his name at 18 to Sten Ljung. He married Märta Öberg, and they had two sons - Fredrik, and his younger brother Janne, who became a successful businessman in New York City. Janne visits Bert and his family over Christmas in Berts ytterligare betraktelser and again in Berts befrielse, and Bert visits him in NYC with family in Berts vidare betraktelser and on his own in Bert Babyface. His religious maternal grandmother Svea Olsson also makes a lot of appearances in the books. Bert plays the electric bass, sings and writes songs in the amateur rock band Heman Hunters (changed to Population Station Groovy WY in Berts befrielse and after a mistake made with posters, to 13 kor och en spann (13 Cows and a Bucket in Swedish) in Bert och beundrarinnorna). He also plays soccer for the amateur team Öreskoga-Kamraternas Idrottsförening, before quitting in Bert och beundrarinnorna. Bert is also interested in mopeds, which in Sweden, one is allowed to drive at 15. He gets a Crescent Trampis moped in Berts bekännelser, before selling it in Berts befrielse.

Åke Nordin
Åke Nordin is Bert's best friend. His mother died in cancer when he was 7 years old. While Bert is interested in girls, Åke is more interested in science, carrying out dangerous experiments with chemicals on his little sister Doris. Åke is the Heman Hunters' electrician and overall technician.

Torleif Andersson
Torleif comes from a family depicted as "intellectual". Torleif likes classical music, and plays the flute and the keyboards in the Heman Hunters. He moves to Helsingborg at in January in Berts bekännelser, but makes a brief return a few days later. Bert, Åke and Erik meet him again in Helsingborg in Berts bokslut.

Erik "Lill-Erik" Linstett
Lill-Erik is the weak guy. He plays the accordion or the drums in the Heman Hunters. Before his arrival from Sundsvall, rumors make everybody think he is the strong "Stor-Erik" or "Erik the Great" who is able to beat up Klimpen. He has a fear of girls, after he showed his penis to his cousin at 5 years old and she told him it looked like a worm. Despite that, he had been on dates in later books.

Rebecka Molin
Rebecka Molin is the first girl Bert is in love with, which occurs in the mid 5th grade when the book series start.

Nadja Nilsson
Nadja Nilsson is a girl born in the autumn in Värmland, and lives with her mother in a cottage. She plays the violin. Her brothers are raggare (basically greasers). Bert falls in love with Nadja in May in the 5th grade, and they come together in June. On 1 March in the 6th grade, Bert breaks up with Nadja. They briefly get together again in Berts befrielse.

Paulina Hlinka
Paulina Hlinka is a girl from what was then Czechoslovakia. When her cousin Pavel visits Sweden in Berts vidare betraktelser, Bert is scared that secret US agents will spot them, and prevent him visiting his uncle Janne in New York City due to the poor relationship between the USA and the USSR, as Czechoslovakia was a USSR-allied state. Bert is in love with Paulina from mid-late 6th grade to early 7th grade, before she leaves him for Dödgrävarn ("gravedigger" in Swedish). Bert later bumps into her in Bert och beundrarinnorna, but as he smells bad, she makes an excuse that she has to get to woodshop class.

Emilia Ridderfjell
Emilia Ridderfjell is a girl who Bert falls in love with in October in the 7th grade. She's interested in horses and schools, and takes singing classes. Her parents are medical doctors. On 1 March in the 8th grade, Emilia breaks up with Bert. While Emilia has been a classmate of Bert since starting the 1st grade, Bert doesn't discover her until he falls in love with her, almost 6 and half year later. Before, she has just been a name on a paper, and a schooldesk in the classroom, except when Bert says "–Sorry" to her in the 3rd grade for accidentally smashing a table tennis ball hitting her dental braces, knocking them out. In Berts bravader, Bert states that liking her is not without social risk (something Bert is always very keenly aware of), since most guys in his class consider her being a wimpish type for having good grades, fine manners and ironed clothes.

She also appears in the Bert comics, where she has a quicker temper, and two cousins, one is named Lovisa from Gothenburg who Bert doesn't know when she arrives by train making Bert confused, and another cousin named Antonia Ridderfjell.

Klas "Klimpen" Svensson
Klimpen is a stereotypical tough guy, who fights, and no one wants to be a friend with. His father has a raggare car. He moves to Motala after the 5th grade. He later briefly returns to Öreskoga in Berts bekymmer, this time soliciting religious donations. Bert, Åke and Erik encounter him in Mjölby in Berts bokslut.

List of books

Old version
Berts dagbok (Bert's Diary) - 1987, new edition in 1993
Bert och brorsorna (Bert and the Brothers) - 1995
Bert och Boysen (Bert and the Boys) - 1996
Bert och bacillerna (Bert and the Coodies) - 1997
Berts första betraktelser (Bert's First Reflections) - 1990
Berts vidare betraktelser (Bert's Further Reflections) - 1991
Berts ytterligare betraktelser (Bert's Additional Reflections) - 1991
Berts bravader (Bert's Exploits) - 1991
Berts bekännelser (Bert's Confessions) - 1992
Bert och badbrudarna (Bert and the Bath Chicks) - 1993
Berts bekymmer (Bert's Worries) - 1994
Berts bryderier (Bert's Embarrassments) - 1995
Berts befrielse (Bert's Liberation) - 1996
Bert och beundrarinnorna (Bert and the Admirers) - 1997
Bert Babyface (Bert Babyface) - 1998
Berts bokslut (Bert's Closure) - 1999

New version
Bert och kalla kriget (Bert and the Cold War) - 2005
Bert och Heman Hunters (Bert and the Heman Hunters) - 2006
Bert + Samira = Sant? (Bert + Samira = True?) - 2007
Bert Badbojen (Bert the bath boy) - 2008
Bert och ryska invasionen (Bert and the Russian Invasion) - 2009
Bert och datadejten (Bert and the Computer Date) - 2010
Bert och friheten (Bert and Freedom) - 2011
Bert får scenskräck (Bert gets stage fright) - 2012
Bert och frestelsen (Bert and the temptation) - 2012
Berts fejsbok (Bert's facebook) - 2013
Bert och skrynkliga tanten (Bert and the wrinkled lady) - 2014

References

External links
 De populära Bertböckerna! 

Book series introduced in 1987
 
Swedish children's novels
Fictional diaries
Swedish children's book series
Teen fiction
Novels set in Sweden
Swedish-language novels